Marina Yakovlevna Boroditskaya (born 1954) is a Russian children's poet and translator.

Boroditskaya was born in Moscow. She graduated from the Moscow State Pedagogical Institute of Foreign Languages.

She is an author of three books of poetry, twelve books of poems for children and numerous translations of poems and fairy tales from English. Her translation of Alan Garner's The Weirdstone of Brisingamen and The Moon of Gomrath was honored by the British Culture Council.

She is also the lead of the "Literary Drugstore" program of the Radio of Russia (Радио России) station.

External links

"Marina Boroditskaya" 
Marina Boroditskaya about herself

Russian women poets
English–Russian translators
Russian children's writers
Russian women children's writers
Writers from Moscow
1954 births
Living people
20th-century Russian translators
20th-century Russian women writers
20th-century Russian writers